Fort Howard was a city in Brown County, Wisconsin, United States. It was first incorporated as a "borough" of 664 acres on October 13, 1856. As the result of a referendum on the union of the two cities held on April 2, 1895, the city was entirely annexed to the City of Green Bay and ceased to exist.

The city took its name from nearby Fort Howard.

Mayors
Fort Howard had nine mayors in its 22 years as a city.

References

Geography of Brown County, Wisconsin
Former populated places in Wisconsin
1856 establishments in Wisconsin
1895 disestablishments in Wisconsin
Populated places established in 1856